Sherobod is a district of Surxondaryo Region in Uzbekistan. The capital lies at the city Sherobod. The district consists of one city (Sherobod), 7 urban-type settlements (Zarabogʻ, Kilkon, Navbogʻ, Paxtaobod, Sariqamish, Choʻyinchi, Yangiariq) and 9 rural communities.

References

Districts of Uzbekistan
Surxondaryo Region